Paris Trout is a 1991 made-for-television drama film directed by Stephen Gyllenhaal, starring Dennis Hopper, Barbara Hershey, and Ed Harris.

It is based on the novel Paris Trout by author Pete Dexter.

Plot
Paris Trout is an unrepentant racist in 1949 Georgia.  The greedy and paranoid shopkeeper murders the sister of a black man who refuses to repay Trout’s IOU.  When Trout is arrested for the crime, he is stunned and enraged, showing himself to be a man of the Old South.  Lawyer Harry Seagraves arrives to calm the waters in court but is soon caught in crimes of his own, including a dangerous and doomed affair with Trout's wife.

Cast
 Dennis Hopper as Paris Trout
 Barbara Hershey as Hanna Trout
 Ed Harris as Harry Seagraves
 Ray McKinnon as Carl Bonner
 Tina Lifford as Mary Sayers
 Darnita Henry as Rosie Sayers
 Eric Ware as Henry Ray Sayers
 RonReaco Lee as Chester Sayers
 Gary Bullock as Buster Devonne
 Sharlene Ross as Mother Trout's Nurse
 Jim Peck as Estes Singletray
 Dan Biggers as Mayor Harn
 Ernest Dixon as Truck Driver
 Wallace Wilkinson as Dr. Brewer
 Ron Leggett as Glass Man

References

External links
 
 

1991 films
1991 drama films
American drama films
American courtroom films
Films about racism
Films directed by Stephen Gyllenhaal
Films set in Georgia (U.S. state)
Films based on American novels
Films scored by David Shire
Viacom Pictures films
1990s English-language films
1990s American films